The word Mirzai is a religious slur used to refer to Ahmadis by many South Asian Muslims, primarily in Pakistan where they have been persecuted from early days and specially after the passage of Second Amendment to the Constitution of Pakistan which declares that Ahmadia are not Muslims and Ordinance XX. Ahmadis are the followers of Mirza Ghulam Ahmad of Qadian.

Etymology and history 
Etymologically, the term is derived from Mirza, a title of Persian origin denoting the rank of high nobleman or Prince. Mirza is the last name of Mirza Ghulam Ahmad, founder of Ahmadiyya.

See also
 Qadiani
 Persecution of Ahmadis
 Human rights in Pakistan#Human rights violations against Ahmadi community

References

Persecution of Ahmadis
Religious slurs for people
Islam-related slurs